The 2017–18 Didi 10 competition is Georgian domestic rugby union competition operated by Georgian Rugby Union. One new team from I league was promoted to Didi 10 (Rustavi Kharebi).

Teams 

 Lelo: Official site
 Aia: Official site
 Locomotive
 Kharebi
 Armazi
 Army
 Jiki
 Bagrati
 Batumi
 Academy

Table 

<noinclude>

Playoffs

Rugby union in Georgia (country)
2018 in Asian rugby union